A Decent Arrangement is a film which released in India on 7 November 2014. This film stars Shabana Azmi, Adam Laupus, Lethia Nall, Farid Currim, Shreya Sharma, Vikram Kapadia, Navniit Nisshan, Adhir Bhat and is directed by Sarovar Banka.

Plot
A Decent Arrangement is the story of Ashok Khosla (Adam Laupus), an Indian-American copywriter who journeys to India seeking an arranged marriage. After he encounters an American woman travelling through India and is set up with an Indian woman who unexpectedly captivates him, Ashok must navigate the complexity of cultural traditions and the leanings of his own heart. With sharp comedy and true-to-life drama, A Decent Arrangement delivers an affecting story that resonates with those of us in search of our place in a changing world.

Cast
 Shabana Azmi as Preeti Mehta
 Adam Laupus as Ashok Khosla
 Diksha Basu as Amita Chandra
 Lethia Nall as Lorie Sanders
 Farid Currim as Bashi Mehta
 Shreya Sharma as Suriya Mehta
 Vikram Kapadia as Arun Khosla
 Navneet Nishan as Gita Khosla
 Adhir Bhat as Vikram Kohli

References

External links
 
 A Decent Arrangement on Bollywoodhungama
 

2011 films
Indian drama films
2010s English-language films